Darin Kimble (born November 22, 1968) is a Canadian former ice hockey forward.

Kimble started his National Hockey League career with the Quebec Nordiques in 1989. He also played for the Chicago Blackhawks, St. Louis Blues, and Boston Bruins. He left the NHL after the 1995 season. Kimble amassed 1,082 penalty minutes in 311 NHL games.

Kimble currently resides in Granite City, Illinois, where he coaches a youth hockey program and is involved with player development.

Career statistics

Regular season and playoffs

External links
 

1968 births
Living people
Albany River Rats players
Arkansas Glaciercats players
Brandon Wheat Kings players
Boston Bruins players
Calgary Wranglers (WHL) players
Canadian ice hockey centres
Chicago Blackhawks players
Halifax Citadels players
Ice hockey people from Saskatchewan
Indianapolis Ice players
Kansas City Blades players
Manitoba Moose (IHL) players
Missouri River Otters players
New Westminster Bruins players
Peoria Rivermen (ECHL) players
Prince Albert Raiders players
Providence Bruins players
Quebec Nordiques draft picks
Quebec Nordiques players
St. Louis Blues players
San Antonio Dragons players
Shreveport Mudbugs players
Canadian expatriate ice hockey people in the United States